Lawrence Arthur Boland (born 1939 in Peoria, Illinois) is a professor of economics at Simon Fraser University.

Boland is critical of the neoclassical research program. He has attempted to draw out the unstated assumptions of neoclassical economics and submit them to methodological scrutiny. His key criticisms of traditional economics center on the problem of induction, methodological individualism, and the acquisition of knowledge.

Published work
 The Foundations of Economic Method (1982), London: Geo. Allen & Unwin 
 Methodology for a New Microeconomics: The Critical Foundations (1986/87), Boston: Allen & Unwin 
 The Methodology of Economic Model Building: Methodology after Samuelson (1989/91), London: Routledge, .
 The Principles of Economics: Some Lies my Teachers Told Me (1992), London: Routledge, .
 Critical Economic Methodology: A Personal Odyssey (1997), London: Routledge, .
 The Foundations of Economic Method: A Popperian Perspective (2003), London: Routledge, .
 Model building in economics : its purposes and limitations (2014), New York: Cambridge University Press,

References

External links 
 Homepage
 Review of The Foundations of Economic Method: A Popperian Perspective (2nd Edition)

Academic staff of Simon Fraser University
Canadian economists
1939 births
Living people